Vezio is a village and former municipality in the canton of Ticino, Switzerland.

In 2005 the municipality was merged with the other, neighboring municipalities Arosio, Breno, Fescoggia and Mugena to form a new and larger municipality Alto Malcantone.

Historic population
The historical population is given in the following table:

References

Former municipalities of Ticino
Villages in Switzerland